The Tour de Lombok Mandalika (abbreviated TDLM) is a multi-day cycling race on the Indonesian island of Lombok. It is part of UCI Asia Tour in category 2.2. The tour covers routes that include cultural and tourist spots in Kuta, Mandalika, and Mataram in Lombok.

Winners

2017 Tour de Lombok
Cyclists from 19 countriesincluding Indonesia, Malaysia, New Zealand and Spain participated in the Tour De Lombok (TDLM) 2017, which was held from April 13 to 16. It was divided into four stages in 485.6 kilometers.
The first leg of the race took riders from the governor's office in Mataram, the capital city of West Nusa Tenggara, to Kuta Beach in Central Lombok with a total distance of 126.3 kilometers. 
The second leg had the cyclists racing over 113.3 kilometers from Bangsal to Senaru in North Lombok. 
The third leg covered 112.1 kilometers from Kuta Beach to Sembalun in Central Lombok. 
The fourth and final leg was a 112-kilometer circuit race consisting of 10 laps in Mataram city.

2018 Tour de Lombok
Cyclists from 18 countries participated the event which was held from April 13 to 15. It was the second edition of the annual event. The race consisted of three stages:  
Stage I: 84.4-km Kuta Mandalika-Kota Mataram route, 
Stage II: 172.4-km Mataram-Sembalun route in East Lombok, and 
Stage II: 110-km Kota Mataram circuit race.

References

External links
 

Lombok
UCI Asia Tour races
Annual events in Indonesia
Cycle races in Indonesia
Recurring sporting events established in 2017
2017 establishments in Indonesia
Sport in West Nusa Tenggara